The Qingdao–Xinhe Expressway, commonly referred to as the Qingxin Expressway, is a  located in the sub-provincial city of Qingdao, in the province of Shandong. It is part of China's National Trunk Highway System and designated G2011. It connects Chengyang District with the county-level cities of Jimo and Pingdu. It is a spur of G20 Qingdao–Yinchuan Expressway.

References

Chinese national-level expressways
Expressways in Shandong